Cercado is a province in Cochabamba Department, Bolivia. Its capital is Cochabamba, which is also the capital of the department.

Subdivision 
The province consists of one municipality, Cochabamba Municipality. It is identical to the province.

The people 
The people are predominantly indigenous citizens of Quechuan and Aymaran descent.

Ref.: obd.descentralizacion.gov.bo

Languages 
The languages spoken in the Cercado Province are mainly Spanish, Quechua, Aymara, and Guaraní. The following table shows the number of those belonging to the recognized group of speakers.

Ref.: obd.descentralizacion.gov.bo

Places of interest 
 Tunari National Park
 Laguna Alalay

References 

 www.ine.gov.bo

External links 
 Population data and map of Cercado Province (Cochabamba Municipality)

Provinces of Cochabamba Department